Slovene Canadians (literally 'Canadian Slovenes') are Canadian citizens of Slovene descent or Slovenian-born people who reside in Canada.

Slovene Canadians by province and territory

Notable Slovene Canadians
 Alojzij Ambrožič, Catholic priest
 Wade Belak, ice hockey player
 Steve Bozek, ice hockey player
 Lolita Davidovich, actress
 Bill Hajt, ice hockey player
 Chris Hajt, ice hockey player
 John Jakopin, ice hockey player
 Ed Kastelic, ice hockey player
 Greg Kuznik, ice hockey player
 Dean Malkoc, ice hockey player
 Joe Mihevc, politician
 Walter Ostanek, accordion musician
 Kevin Pangos, basketball player
 John Smrke, ice hockey player
 Stan Smrke, ice hockey player
 Tina Srebotnjak, television journalist
 Matt Stajan, ice hockey player
 Elvis Stojko, figure skater
 Randy Velischek, ice hockey player
Walter Wolf, businessman

See also
 European Canadian
 Slovene Americans
 Slovene Argentines

References

 
Slovenian diaspora